The AGLS Metadata Standard, originally known as the Australian Government Locator Service, was created by the National Archives of Australia as a standard to describe government resources. It was published for a general audience by Standards Australia as AS 5044:2002, and reissued as AS 5044-2010 on 30 June 2010. AGLS is used by some government agencies in Australia to describe online resources and services.

AGLS is an application profile of the Dublin Core metadata standard.

In December 2022, The National Archives of Australia announced its intention to decommission the AGLS website and rescind the mandate for its use by Australian Government agencies.

See also

References

External links 
 

Standards of Australia